Acetylferrocene is the organoiron compound with the formula (C5H5)Fe(C5H4COCH3).  It consists of ferrocene substituted by an acetyl group on one of the cyclopentadienyl rings.  It is an orange, air-stable solid that is soluble in organic solvents.

Preparation and reactions
Acetylferrocene is prepared by Friedel-Crafts acylation of ferrocene, usually with acetic anhydride (Ac2O):
Fe(C5H5)2  +  Ac2O   →   (C5H5)Fe(C5H4Ac)  +  HOAc

The experiment is often conducted in the instructional laboratory to illustrate acylation as well as chromatographic separations.

Acetylferrocene can be converted to many derivatives, e.g., reduction to the chiral alcohol (C5H5)Fe(C5H4CH(OH)Me) and precursor to vinylferrocene. The oxidized derivative, acetylferrocenium, is used as a 1e-oxidant in the research laboratory.

References

External links

Ferrocenes
Cyclopentadienyl complexes